Kilmeena GAA is a Gaelic football club associated with the town of Westport in County Mayo, Ireland.

History
The club was founded in 1889, and first fielded a team against Westport at Kilmeena on 10 March 1889. The club's grounds, Saint Brendan's Park, was opened in 1938, with additional facilities opened subsequently, including a new club house which was opened (by Pat Holmes) in 2000.

Primarily involved in Gaelic football, Kilmeena won the All-Ireland Junior Club Football Championship in 2022.

Honours
 Mayo Junior Football Championship (5)
 1977, 1986, 1993, 2002, 2021
 Connacht Junior Club Football Championship (2)
 2002, 2022
 All-Ireland Junior Club Football Championship (1)
 2022

References

External links

Gaelic football clubs in County Mayo
Gaelic games clubs in County Mayo